The 2nd Arabian Gulf Cup was the second edition of the Arabian Gulf Cup. The tournament was held in Riyadh, Saudi Arabia and was won by defending champions Kuwait for the second time. The tournament took place between 16 and 28 March 1972. Kuwait won their second consecutive title, edging out Saudi Arabia on goal difference after both nations finished with equal points. This makes it the first time that the title was decided by goal difference.

United Arab Emirates made their debut in the competition and finished third. Bahrain withdrew after walking off the field, during the final match of the tournament, against Saudi Arabia to protest the officiating. They were subsequently ejected from the competition and their results were expunged.

Teams

{| class="wikitable sortable"
|-
! Team
! data-sort-type="number"|Previous appearances in tournament
|-
|   || 1 (1970)
|-
|   || 1 (1970)
|-
|   || 1 (1970)
|-
|  (host) || 1 (1970)
|-
|   || 0 (debut)
|}

Venues

Match officials

Tournament
The four teams in the tournament played a single round-robin style competition. The team achieving first place in the overall standings was the tournament winner.

All times are local, AST (UTC+3).

Matches

Note: The match was abandoned after 60 minutes after Bahrain walked off the field to protest the officiating. Bahrain were subsequently ejected from the competition and their record was expunged.

Result

Statistics

Goalscorers

Awards
Player of the Tournament
 Farouq Ibrahim

Top Scorer
 Saeed Ghurab (5 goals)

Goalkeeper of the Tournament
 Ahmed Eid Al-Harbi

References

External links 
 Official Site (Arabic)

1972
1972
1972 in Asian football
1971–72 in Saudi Arabian football